The 2010 IIHF World Championship Division III was an international Ice Hockey tournament run by the International Ice Hockey Federation. The tournament was contested from April 13–18, 2010. For the first time, the IIHF allowed eight teams, rather than six, to compete in Division III, which was handled by separating the teams into two groups. Group A was played in Kockelscheuer, Luxembourg, while Group B's games took place in Yerevan, Armenia. The process reverted to the single group of six teams the following year.

The IIHF announced on February 5, 2010 that the Division III Group A championship would be moved from Athens, Greece to Kockelscheuer, Luxembourg after the Hellenic Ice Sports Federation announced they would not able to host the tournament after problems with government funding. Ireland and North Korea were both promoted to Division II for the 2011 World Championships. According to the IIHF, due to eligibility issues all games involving Armenia's became 5–0 wins for the opposing teams and Armenia was excluded from the final ranking.

Participants

Group A

Group B

Group A Tournament

Standings

Tournament Awards
 Best players selected by the directorate  
Best Goaltender: Kevin Kelly  (52 saves from 57 shots on goal)
Best Forward: Mark Morrison  (4 goals, 2 assists)
Best Defenceman: Francois Schons  (1 goal, 1 assist)

Fixtures

All times local.

Scoring leaders
List shows the top skaters sorted by points, then goals.

GP = Games played; G = Goals; A = Assists; Pts = Points; +/− = Plus/minus; PIM = Penalties in minutes; POS = PositionSource: IIHF.com

Leading goaltenders
Only the top four goaltenders, based on save percentage, who have played 40% of their team's minutes are included in this list.
TOI = Time On Ice (minutes:seconds); SA = Shots against; GA = Goals against; GAA = Goals against average; Sv% = Save percentage; SO = ShutoutsSource: IIHF.com

Group B Tournament

Standings

Fixtures
All times local.

Bronze-medal game

Gold-medal game

References

2010
4
2010 in Armenian sport
2010 in Luxembourgian sport
2010 in Irish sport
2010 in Greek sport
2010 in South African sport
2010
2010
Sports competitions in Luxembourg City
April 2010 sports events in Europe
2010s in Luxembourg